Jeremy Keith Morris Sanders  (born 3 May 1948) is a British chemist and Emeritus Professor in the Department of Chemistry at the University of Cambridge. He is also Editor-in-Chief of Royal Society Open Science. He is known for his contributions to many fields including NMR spectroscopy and supramolecular chemistry.  He served as the Pro-Vice-Chancellor for Institutional Affairs at the University of Cambridge, 2011–2015.

Education
Educated in London at Southmead Primary School and Wandsworth Comprehensive School, he then studied chemistry at Imperial College London where he graduated with a Bachelor of Science degree in 1969 and was awarded the Edmund White Prize.  During 1969–72 he carried out his PhD research on lanthanide shift reagents, especially Eu(DPM), the original reagent developed before Eu(FOD) at Churchill College, Cambridge, supervised by Dudley Williams.

Career and Research 
Elected a fellow of Christ's College, Cambridge, in 1972, he spent a postdoctoral year in the Pharmacology Department, Stanford University before returning to Cambridge to become a Demonstrator in Chemistry.  He was promoted to Lecturer (1978), Reader (1992) and then Professor (1996–2015).  He was Head of the Chemistry Department 2000–2006, and Head of the School of Physical Sciences 2009–2011; he was also Deputy Vice-Chancellor 2006–2010 (responsible for overseeing the University's 800th Anniversary celebrations).

He was Chair from 2004 to 2008 of sub-panel 18 (Chemistry) for the UK 2008 Research Assessment Exercise.

NMR Spectroscopic achievements include the first complete analyses of the proton spectra of steroids through the pioneering use of NOEs and two-dimensional techniques, and new understanding of the biophysical chemistry in vivo of microbial storage polymers.

In supramolecular chemistry, his porphyrin systems have led to one of the first experimental verifications of the predicted Marcus 'inverted region', and the standard model (with Chris Hunter) of aromatic π-π interactions. He has used the coordination chemistry of Zn, Sn, Ru, Rh and Al oligoporphyrins  to create new complex systems, to develop new templated approaches in synthesis, and to engineer the acceleration of intermolecular reactions within host cavities.

Since the mid-1990s he has been in the forefront (with Jean-Marie Lehn and several other research groups) of developing Dynamic covalent chemistry and the closely related dynamic combinatorial chemistry. In dynamic covalent chemistry, the most stable accessible product of a mixture is formed using thermodynamically controlled reversible reactions; in dynamic combinatorial chemistry a template is used to direct the synthesis of the molecule that best stabilises the template.  In each case unpredictable molecules may be discovered that would not be designed or could not be prepared by conventional chemistry.  These approaches have been particularly successful in preparing unpredictable Catenanes and other complex macrocycles including a molecular knot.

Sanders has also recently discovered helical supramolecular nanotubes capable of binding C60 Fullerene and other guests.

Awards and honours

1975 – Meldola Medal and Prize, Royal Institute of Chemistry
1981 – Hickinbottom Award, Royal Society of Chemistry, Royal Society of Chemistry
1984 – Pfizer Academic Award (for work on nuclear Overhauser effect), Royal Society of Chemistry
1988 – Pfizer Academic Award (for work on in vivo NMR), Royal Society of Chemistry
1994 – Josef Loschmidt Prize, Royal Society of Chemistry
1995 – Elected Fellow of the Royal Society (FRS)
1996 – Pedler Medal and Prize, Royal Society of Chemistry
2002 – Visiting Fellow, Japan Society for Promotion of Science, JSPS
2003 – Izatt-Christensen Award in Macrocyclic Chemistry (U.S.A.). A competitive award which recognizes excellence in macrocyclic chemistry, founded by Reed McNeil Izatt and James J. Christensen.
2009 – Davy Medal, The Royal Society "for his pioneering contributions to several fields, most recently to the field of dynamic combinatorial chemistry at the forefront of supramolecular chemistry"
2011 – President (Vice-President 2010), Bürgenstock Conference, Switzerland

He was appointed Commander of the Order of the British Empire (CBE) in the 2014 Birthday Honours for services to scientific research. Sanders' nomination for the Royal Society reads:

External links
 Interviewed by Alan Macfarlane 22 September 2009 (video)

References

1948 births
Living people
British chemists
Commanders of the Order of the British Empire
Fellows of the Royal Society
Alumni of Imperial College London
Fellows of Selwyn College, Cambridge
Alumni of Churchill College, Cambridge
Members of the University of Cambridge Department of Chemistry